Traición is a 1923 Chilean silent film, the second film of Carlos F. Borcosque. It stars María Brieba, Yvonne D'Albert, Jorge Infante and boxer Luis Vicentini.

Cast
María Brieba 		
Yvonne D'Albert 			
Jorge Infante 		
Luis Vicentini

References

External links
 

1923 films
Chilean silent films
Films directed by Carlos F. Borcosque
Chilean black-and-white films